ONS (formerly NostalgieNet) is a Dutch commercial television channel owned by Bureauvijftig, which is dedicated to viewers aged 50 years or older. ONS's main target is the older audience. ONS airs footage from the forties to the eighties. Each month a specific theme is on the channel. Topics such as the Dutch East Indies, Netherlands Waterland, railroads, mills, work, food and household are broadcast. The channel launched as NostalgieNet on 1 January 2006 and changed its name into ONS on 13 September 2015. On 1 January 2020, Bureauvijftig took over ONS from Just Media Group. ONS is available in HD through Ziggo since 10 February 2022.

ONS can be received through Ziggo, KPN, Caiway, KBG, Canal Digitaal, CAI Harderwijk, Glashart Media and HSO in the Netherlands, and through TV Vlaanderen in Flanders.

Programs
ONS broadcasts include the following programs:

Additionally ONS's television broadcasts include De Dageraad, Sil de Strandjutter and Portret van een Passie.
On Wednesdays Dutch films, like Het meisje met den blauwen hoed, De dijk is dicht and Kort Amerikaans.

Furthermore, ONS airs several old foreign (mostly British) comedy and drama productions such as 'Allo 'Allo!, Are You Being Served?, Hi-de-Hi!, Keeping Up Appearances and Ballykissangel.

References

External links
  

Television channels in the Netherlands
Television channels in Flanders
Television channels and stations established in 2006